The HVDC Three Gorges – Guangdong is a 940 kilometre-long bipolar HVDC transmission line in China for the transmission of electric power from the Three Gorges power plant to the area of Guangdong. The powerline went into service in 2004. It runs from the static inverter station Jingzhou near the Three Gorges power plant to the static inverter plant Huizhou near Guangdong. The HVDC Three Gorges-Guangdong is a bipolar 500 kV powerline with a maximum transmission power rating of 3,000 megawatts.

Sites

References

External links

 ABB

Electric power infrastructure in China
HVDC transmission lines
2004 establishments in China
Energy infrastructure completed in 2004